Brazil–China relations refers to the current and historical relationship between Brazil and China. Relations between Brazil and China began in the early nineteenth century and continued until 1949, when they were disrupted by the creation of the People's Republic of China (PRC). Diplomatic relations between the PRC and Brazil officially began in 1974 with agreement on the establishment and operation of Brazil's embassy in Beijing and China's embassy in Brasília. Since then, bilateral ties have developed mostly based on non-interference, equality, and mutual benefit (win-win).

The growing economic and political relationship between the two countries was confirmed by Lula's visit to China, which included 450 Brazilian business representatives. Brazilian foreign minister Celso Amorim noted that the growing relationship could be part of a ‘reconfiguration of the world's commercial and diplomatic geography’.

Both nations are members of BRICS, G20 and the United Nations.

History
Early undertakings involving Brazil and China were mediated by the mutual participation of Brazil and Macao in the Portuguese Empire. The first of these connections dates to 1812, when Queen Maria I of Portugal, then based in Brazil, imported Chinese laborers to work on a tea plantation near Rio de Janeiro. In 1900, a fresh wave of immigrants from China settled in São Paulo.

In 1879, Admiral Arthur Silveira da Motta, Baron of Jaceguai and soon to be the first Brazilian envoy extraordinary and minister plenipotentiary in Beijing, led a "naval mission" to China to established diplomatic relations, while another mission was sent to London to discuss Chinese immigration with China's diplomats there. Formal relations between the Empire of Brazil and the Qing Dynasty were established in September 1880 with the Treaty of Friendship, Commerce and Navigation. The Chinese refused, however, to permit Brazilians to hire Chinese as contract laborers, knowing that non-white laborers were treated "as machines or as cheap labour". The British were also opposed to the importation of Chinese labor to Brazil, believing it would inevitably result in de facto slavery. (Slavery in Brazil was only abolished in 1888.) Late in 1893, José de Costa Azevedo, Baron of Ladario, went to Beijing to negotiate a new treaty on immigration, but the Chinese were uninterested.

Formal relations ended with the Republic of China ended following the Chinese Civil War (1927–50) and were only re-established with the People's Republic of China  in 1974. In the 21st century Brazilian businessmen have been somewhat frustrated by what the Financial Times have described as a slow pace of development for some aspects of the relationship. For example, Brazil officially recognised China as a market economy in 2004 but by 2009 the corresponding changes to the trading arrangements had not been implemented.  However agreement had been reached on a wide range of issues, and an outstanding personal relationship had been established between the two nation's leaders. In 2010 the second BRIC Summit was held in Brazil, with proposals made for increased cooperation between Brazil and China on political and trade related issues as well as energy, mining, financial services and agriculture.

Former Chinese leader Hu Jintao said in his address to the Brazilian Congress on November 12, 2004, that ‘both Latin America and China have similar experiences in gaining national liberation, defending national independence and constructing the country’. Therefore, ‘both sides have the same feelings and common languages’. He said that ‘China-Latin American relations were expected to support each other in the political fields, strengthen economic complementarily, and carry out close cultural contacts’.

Before his election as the President of Brazil in 2018, Jair Bolsonaro made very critical comments on China. He even stated  “China is not buying in Brazil, it is buying Brazil. Are we going to leave Brazil in the hands of the Chinese?“ However, President Bolsonaro's policy towards China has avoided confrontation and it has been characterized by a pragmatic approach and even rapprochement. Brazil is still the main destination for Chinese investment in the South American continent.

In August 2019, China defended Brazil from Western criticism of the 2019 Amazon rainforest wildfires, with the Chinese Ambassador to Brazil describing the criticism as a "bit fabricated". This led to thanks from Brazilian President Jair Bolsonaro, who described it as "a grand gesture that strengthened us a lot."

In October 2019, Brazilian President Jair Bolsonaro paid an official visit to China. He met Chinese leader and CCP general secretary Xi Jinping.

Economics
China became Brazil's largest trading partner in 2009. Former Brazilian President Luiz Inácio Lula da Silva and many in the Brazilian media consider China to be "Brazil's most promising business partner and a strategic ally" due to China's "rapidly rising demand for raw materials and agricultural produce". Bilateral trade grew from US$6.7 billion in 2003 to US$36.7 billion in 2009.

China and Brazil cooperate economically on quite some mutual beneficial projects such as the already in 1988 preparations for a joint project to construct the China–Brazil Earth Resources Satellite program, which in 1999 and 2002 successfully constructed two satellites providing key information on (new sources of) natural resources. Secondly, an International Satellite Communications company (INSCOM) was set up as a joint venture.

Other projects in the range  of the Earth Resources Satellite are the construction of Porto do Açu near Rio de Janeiro, Vitória and Campos dos Goytacazes, which can handle Chinamax containerships to import and export raw materials and manufactures vice versa. Other major important infrastructure investment are the construction of a continental pipeline, roads and high speed trains.

Chinese investment in Brazil takes strategic approaches and does so in strategic areas to consolidate China's role in the Brazilian economy, this creates economic leverage, expands the zone of influence of Chinese companies in Brazil and increases interdependence. Chinese investments in Brazil are concentrated mainly in the energy, mining, steel and oil industries.

In 2010, despite the generally friendly and close relationship, Brazil was one of the few emerging economies to publicly criticise China's policy in relation to the so-called Currency war. Brazil has called for China to allow a faster appreciation of its currency, which would help other countries to better compete against Chinese exports. Brazil also criticised US policy, saying both China and the US should seek to avoid escalating economic tension concerning trade and currency.

Trade between China and Brazil was worth almost 80 billion US Dollars as of 2014. China is expanding economic ties into Latin America, and Brazil falls into that category. China is investing a Brazilian electric transmission line from the Amazon, as well as importing Brazilian planes and beef. China and Brazil, both members of BRICS, are competing for influence in Latin America. Brazil is considered a regional powerhouse in Latin America. China seeks more access to raw materials from Latin American countries  such as Argentina and Venezuela to fuel their manufacturing economy .

As of 2017, China began construction of a Northern Brazil-based seaport that will primarily ship foodstuffs to their home country. Communicated and service based products have also been flowing into the Brazilian market as a result of the infrastructure project. With China's plan of investing in development around the world, the Latin American country received the benefit of the future Chinese international investment plan. With infrastructure development of Brazil seaports and waterways, access to the Chinese soy markets is expected to increase. Due to the US–China tariff dispute, the source of soy from the US coming in to China will be decreasing. Whereas the Brazilian soy market is becoming more favorable to the Chinese. China sees Brazil as another source of soy.

In late March 2017,  due to quality control issues of the Brazilian beef and poultry industry; China along with South Korea, the European Union, and Brazil's Latin American trading partner Chile halted or reduced meat imports from Brazil. The quality control issues consisted of contamination cases. A few days later, China reopened its market for Brazil to resume access to its ports after the meatpacking companies responsible were identified. China is considered Brazil's largest customer for meat products.

In 2016, as two respective members of the BRICS association, trade representatives from all 5 members including Brazil and China agreed to start investment amongst members, update of trading ports, and promotion of free trade. China and Brazil individually made a cooperative deal that would focus on several economic sectors, including infrastructure development, financial services, and tourism. In 2017, $20 Billion US Dollars focused on infrastructure development in Brazil had been placed into action, to which China will pay 75% of the fund. Banks in China are focused mostly on energy infrastructure.

Chinese customers of American-based ethanol will be economically pressed to find alternative ethanol sources due to US–China tariffs. In the next few years fuel ethanol will not meet demand for ethanol in China. Chinese Corporations may turn to Brazil in the near future to meet market demand. Brazil has recently in the last few years been exporting raw materials to China. Brazil in turn import manufactured goods from the People's Republic.

In April 2018, Brazilian oil company Petrobras has received severals bids to sell a natural gas line to increase revenue. China's Silk Road Fund Company has been named as one of the bidders interested in the company's Gas Line System,  costing $21 billion US dollars. Brazil's Petrobras and CNPC have hosted talks to have the Chinese firm agree to financially back an upgrade of a Brazilian oil refinery in return to receive oil. China has already taken part in recent Brazilian oil related projects. In October 2019, on a state visit to China, Bolsonaro announced the end of the need for visas for Chinese entry into Brazil.

Trade 
China is increasing investment in Brazil, with financing oil exploration to repairing railways. The repair of railways and infrastructure came ahead of the Rio Olympics in 2016. There is also a trade phase from raw materials to heavy equipment and industrial goods. The two countries have also signed a currency agreement that will include up to $30 billion worth of Chinese Yuan and Brazilian real. This deal was signed to provide an alternative currency to the US Dollar with respect to the Chinese Yuan. China is considered Brazil's largest trading partners.

Brazil and China are members of an economic organization called BRICS, also consisting of Russia, India, and South Africa. China contributes 41% of the total operating budget. Brazil contributes 18% of the operating budget. China and Brazil are part of a greater goal, to increase trade among rising and developing markets.

In November 2015, several steel organizations from  Brazil, along with Mexico, the European Union, and the United States advocated that countries doing business with China should evaluate their trading behavior before accepting China as a Market economy. In 2016, Brazil  remained neutral in the China World Trade Organization debate, and their market status in metal sector. China has put up challenges to those who question their market economy. China has been accused of dumping their exports into Brazilian market.

Infrastructure 
In 2015, the governments of China, Peru, and Brazil  proposed a plan to build a railway starting from the Atlantic Coast in Brazil to the Pacific Coast in Peru. China agreed to financially support the railway project. Due to recent recession in Brazil, and environmental concern regarding the Amazon Rainforest, the original project plan involving the Chinese government did not go into action. The transcontinental rail system would cut freight expenses and time for China by using the proposed railway to ship materials from Brazil and Peru. China has been the largest trading partner of Brazil since 2009.

Resident diplomatic missions
 Brazil has an embassy in Beijing and consulates-general in Guangzhou, Hong Kong and Shanghai.
 China has an embassy in Brasília and consulates-general in Recife, Rio de Janeiro and São Paulo.

See also
 China–Latin America relations
 Chinese Brazilians

References

External links 
 The Sino-Brazilian Principles in a Latin American and BRICS Context: The Case for Comparative Public Budgeting Legal Research Wisconsin International Law Journal, 13 May 2015
 China to reinforce strategic partnership with Brazil: envoy People's Daily, 2 January 2011
 Bridging the Distance: Brazil and China Relations in the Age of Globalization  International Studies Association May 6, 2009
 The Panda Hugs the Tucano: China's Relations with Brazil The Jamestown Foundation, 15 May 2009
 Brazil's China Headache Council on Foreign Relations, 14 December 2009
 'New Stage in Relations': China, Brazil to Build, Launch Earth Satellite Los Angeles Times, 8 July 2008

 
China
Bilateral relations of China